Grab the Wheel may refer to:
"Grab the Wheel", 2002 song by The Heroine Sheiks from the album Siamese Pipe
"Grab the Wheel", 2016 song by Lil Uzi Vert from his mixtape Lil Uzi Vert vs. the World
"Grab the Wheel", 2017 song by Timbaland

See also
"Somebody Grab the Wheel", 2015 song by Whitey